McEnroe is a talk show on CNBC hosted by tennis player John McEnroe.  It was broadcast July 7, 2004 through December 15, 2004.

The show debuted on July 7, 2004. McEnroe's sidekick was John Fugelsang. It averaged 174,000 viewers in its first week, compared with about 200,000 drawn by its predecessor, The News with Brian Williams. The show was panned by critics right from its debut, and in August 2004, it was reported that the show had twice garnered a Nielsen rating of 0.0.

On December 3, 2004, CNBC executives sent a memo to network employees saying the show was being canceled. McEnroe was given the option of stopping production immediately or allowing the show to go two more weeks. McEnroe decided to let the show last two more weeks to give the behind-the-scenes workers more work before the show went off-air. The last episode aired on December 15, 2004. Its 10 pm slot was taken by another talk show, The Big Idea with Donny Deutsch.

During the time after the report of the 0.0 rating came up, which was during the two-week break the show took for CNBC's coverage of the 2004 Summer Olympics, Woody Fraser was brought in to be the executive producer to try to save the show, using his powers to try things like making McEnroe dress more professionally by wearing suits and ties, and having Fugelsang less involved, but to no avail.

The show was taped at CNBC's New Jersey studio, and tapings began at about 2 p.m.  The show aired Monday through Thursday on the network.  McEnroe's wife, Patty Smyth, sang the show's theme song.

References

External links

CNBC original programming
2000s American television talk shows
2004 American television series debuts
2004 American television series endings
John McEnroe